This is a list of notable people who are from Saskatchewan, Canada, or have spent a large part or formative part of their career in that province.

A
 Velma Abbott (1929-1987) – All-American Girls Professional Baseball League player
 Mark Abley – writer
 Dan Achen – guitarist, producer, co-founder of alternative rock band Junkhouse
 Mel Angelstad – professional ice hockey player
 Hazen Argue - politician, Senator, MP, Cabinet Minister
 Colby Armstrong – NHL hockey player with Toronto Maple Leafs
 Riley Armstrong – NHL hockey player with Detroit Red Wings
 Brent Ashton – former NHL hockey player
 Dick Assman – gas station attendant facetiously given fame on the David Letterman television show
 Calvin Ayre – founder of Bodog

B
 Mike Babcock – Head Coach of the NHL's Toronto Maple Leafs Head Coach, Canadian Ice Hockey Olympic Team, 2012, Head Coach, Canadian Ice Hockey World Cup Team, 2016
 Lorne Babiuk – director, VIDO
 Garnet Bailey – NHL forward, died on United Airlines Flight 175
 Mike Bales – hockey player
 J. G. Ballard – English novelist and short story writer
 Burke Barlow – musician
 Doris Barr (1921-2009) – All-American Girls Professional Baseball League player
 Wade Belak – former NHL player with Nashville Predators (deceased 2011)
 Catherine Bennett (born 1920) – All-American Girls Professional Baseball League player
 Red Berenson – Team Canada 1972, former NHL player and coach, Head Coach of the University of Michigan Ice Hockey Team
 Todd Bergen – hockey player
 Sarah Binks – fictional character created by Paul Hiebert, in whose gently satirical biography Regina figures as the rustic's metropolis
 Byron Bitz – former professional hockey player
 Randy Black – drummer for Primal Fear
 Trevor Blackwell – entrepreneur
 Mike Blaisdell – former NHL player
 Allan Blakeney – former Premier of Saskatchewan
 Derek Boogaard – former NHL hockey player with New York Rangers (deceased 2011)
 Mike Botha – master diamond cutter
 Ray Boughen – former mayor, current Member of Parliament for the riding of Palliser
 Johnny Bower – hockey goaltender
 Bob Boyer – visual artist, elder, university professor
 Tyler Bozak – NHL player
 Beverley Breuer – actor whose credits include Scary Movie 4
 Dave Brown – former NHL player
 Sidney Buckwold – former Mayor of Saskatoon
 David Luther Burgess – World War I pilot and politician
 Garth Butcher – NHL player
 Brent Butt – actor

C
 Hugh Cairns (VC) – World War I soldier awarded the Victoria Cross
 Jock Callander – IHL all-time scoring leader
 Lorne Calvert – Premier of Saskatchewan (2001–2007)
 Scotty Cameron – hockey player
 Earl Cameron – broadcaster
 Wendel Clark – former professional hockey player
 Ethel Catherwood – Olympic medallist
 Emily Clark (ice hockey) - Olympic hockey player
 Lawrence Clarke – HBC official
 Reggie Cleveland – World Series-starting baseball pitcher
 Kim Coates (born 1958) – Canadian/American actor, Sons of Anarchy; born in Saskatoon 
 Terry Cochrane – Canadian football player
 John Comiskey – football player
 Neil Stanley Crawford – politician and jazz musician

D
 Mark Dacey – 2004 Brier Champion 
 Rod Dallman – hockey player
 Charlie David – actor
 Spencer Davis – general foreman
 Stu Davis - country & western singer/songwriter, recording artist, television and radio host
 Thomas Osborne Davis – politician
 Scott Deibert – former Canadian football player
 Graham DeLaet – professional golfer
 Ivor Dent – politician
 Phyllis Dewar – Olympic swimmer
 John Diefenbaker – former Prime Minister of Canada
 Robert Dirk – former NHLer
 Ken Doraty – former National Hockey League player
 Liam Dougherty – ice dancer
 Shirley Douglas – actor, daughter of T.C. Douglas; mother of Kiefer Sutherland
 T.C. Douglas – CCF premier 1944–1961; later leader of the federal New Democratic Party
 Rick Ducommun – actor
 Duke Dukowski – former NHLer
 Mathew Dumba – ice hockey player

E
 Jordan Eberle – NHL player for the New York Islanders
 Murray Edwards – one of the richest Canadians
 Michael Eklund – actor
 Dan Ellis – NHL goaltender with Florida Panthers
 Shane Endicott – former NHL hockey player

F
 Joe Fafard – sculptor and artist
 Sylvia Fedoruk – scientist, former Lieutenant Governor of Saskatchewan
 Feist (full name Leslie Feist) – singer-songwriter best known for her 2007 hit single "1234"
 Larry Fisher – murderer of Gail Miller
 Robert Fleming – composer, pianist, organist, choirmaster, and teacher
 Emile Francis – former National Hockey League player and coach
 Lisa Franks – Paralympic athlete
 Don Freed – singer/songwriter
 Dawna Friesen – newscaster
 Jackie Friesen – assistant coach with the Wisconsin Badgers women's ice hockey team
 Pete Friesen – guitar player for Alice Cooper, Bruce Dickinson of Iron Maiden and The Almighty
 Gayleen Froese – author
 Wes Funk – writer

G
 Michael Garnett – former NHL goaltender with the Atlanta Thrashers
 Chris Getzlaf – CFL player
 Ryan Getzlaf – NHL player
 Clark Gillies – former National Hockey League player
 Joanna Glass – playwright
 Glenda Goertzen – author
 Bruce Gordon - athlete and Detective Sergeant
 Dirk Graham – NHL player
 Thelma Grambo – All-American Girls Professional Baseball League player
 Mary Greyeyes (1920 – 2011), the first First Nations woman to join the Canadian Armed Forces
 Roland Groome – first licensed commercial pilot in Canada
 Tom Grummett – comic book artist
 Eric Gryba – NHL player with the Edmonton Oilers
 Peter Gzowski – resided in Moose Jaw in 1957
Michael Greyeyes - Canadian actor, born in Saskatchewan.

H
 Chris Hajt – professional ice hockey player, Lukko
 Emmett Hall – former Supreme Court Justice
 Stu Hart – professional wrestling patriarch
 Scott Hartnell – NHL player
 Ellie Harvie – actress; portrayed Morticia on The New Addams Family; was raised in Prince Albert
 Dale Henry – hockey player
 Jamie Heward – NHL player
 Bill Hicke – NHL player with the Montreal Canadiens, New York Rangers, Oakland Seals, and the Pittsburgh Penguins
 Douglas Hill – author
 Ray Hnatyshyn – former Governor General of Canada
 Randy Hoback – politician
 Braden Holtby – NHL goaltender
 Gustin House – Lyell Gustin, decades-long teacher of many eminent pianists province-wide
 Stan Hovdebo – politician and educator
 Gordie Howe – former NHL and WHA hockey player
 Bill Hunter – ice hockey entrepreneur (deceased 2002)

I
 Roger Ing – artist
 Into Eternity – progressive metal band 
 Dick Irvin Jr. – Hockey Night in Canada broadcaster
 James Isbister – Métis leader

J
 Honoré Jackson – Métis leader
 tom jackson -actor and folk singer
 Colin James – six-time Juno award-winning blues-rock musician
 Harry Jerome – sprinter
 Christine Jewitt (born 1926) – All-American Girls Professional Baseball League player
 Arleene Johnson (born 1924) – All-American Girls Professional Baseball League player
 Marguerite Jones (1917-1995) – All-American Girls Professional Baseball League player
 Daisy Junor (1919-2012) – All-American Girls Professional Baseball League player

K
 Connie Kaldor – singer
 Miklos Kanitz – Holocaust survivor
 Ryan Keller – NHL hockey player, Ottawa Senators
 Donald M. Kendrick – Calgary native, choral conductor and teacher at the University of Saskatchewan, Regina Campus, in the 1970s
 Dave King – university and NHL hockey coach
 Joy Kogawa – author and poet
 Kirk Krack  – freediver
 Darcy Kuemper – goalie for the NHL franchise Minnesota Wild
 Chris Kunitz – NHL player
 Kaylyn Kyle – member of the Canada women's national soccer team

L
 John Henderson Lamont  – Supreme Court Justice
 Annette Lapointe – writer
 Regan Lauscher – Canadian luge champion
 James Le Jeune (born 1910) – painter, born in Saskatoon
 Catriona Le May Doan – speed skater, Olympic medallist
 Curtis Leschyshyn – former NHL hockey player
 Brock Lesnar – professional wrestler currently signed with WWE; residence in Regina
 Sarah Lind – actor
 Art Linkletter – radio and television host of Art Linkletter's House Party 
 Reed Low – former National Hockey League player
 Trey Lyles – professional basketball player

M
 Keith Magnuson (died 2003) – former NHL hockey player, Chicago Blackhawks
 Charles Mair – poet
 Kevin Mambo - actor and musician
 Tyler Mane – former pro wrestler and actor
 Yann Martel – Booker Prize-winning author
 Tatiana Maslany – actress
 Mike Maurer – CFL fullback
 Chris McAllister – former NHL hockey player
 Bud McCaig – co-owner of the Calgary Flames
 Ethel McCreary – All-American Girls Professional Baseball League player
 Mick McGeough – NHL referee
 Frances Gertrude McGill – pioneering forensic pathologist and criminologist
 Thomas McKay – politician and farmer
 Mark McMorris – professional snowboarder
 Gail Miller – victim murder by Larry Fisher, for which David Milgaard was falsely convicted
 Gerry Minor – former NHLer
 Mike Mintenko – Commonwealth Games swimmer
 David Mitchell, National Lacrosse League player
 Joni Mitchell – musician, artist
 Ken Mitchell – author, member of the Order of Canada
 Allan Moffat – racing car driver and four-time winner of the Bathurst 1000
 
 Blair Morgan – motocross/snowcross athlete
 Keith Morrison – former NBC television news anchor
 Brenden Morrow, retired NHL hockey player
 Farley Mowat – novelist
 Jerome Mrazek – hockey player
 Scott Munroe – American Hockey League player
 Garth Murray – NHL player

N
 Steve Nash – former professional basketball player and head coach of the NBA's Brooklyn Nets
 Zarqa Nawaz – creator of the CBC sitcom Little Mosque on the Prairie
 Carey Nelson – long-distance runner
 Jeff Nelson – hockey player
 Darin Nesbitt – professor at Douglas College
 Ted Newall – entrepreneur
 Erik Nielsen – federal politician, former deputy prime minister
 Leslie Nielsen – actor whose credits include Airplane!, Naked Gun and Scary Movie 4

O
 Fergie Olver – Toronto Blue Jays broadcaster
 Paul Owen – cricketer

P
 Ryan Parent – hockey player
 Donny Parenteau – country music singer, songwriter, and musician
 Denis Pederson – hockey player
 Michael Peers – Archbishop of Qu'Appelle; Primate of the Anglican Church of Canada 1986-2004
 Michaela Pereira – Former CNN anchor, HLN Anchor
 Janet Perkin (1921-2012) – professional baseball and curling player
 Krista Phillips – professional basketball player (former University of Michigan Women's Basketball player)
 Rich Pilon – former NHL hockey player
 "Rowdy" Roddy Piper (Roderick Toombs) (died 2015) – professional wrestler and film actor
 Jason Plumb – popular musician formerly with the Waltons
 Logan Pyett, AHL player (Detroit Red Wings organization) and member of gold medal-winning Team Canada in 2005-2006 (U18 Junior World Cup) and 2007-2008 (World Junior Championship)

R
 Doug Redl – Canadian football player
 Wade Redden – NHL defenceman
 Scott Redl – Canadian football player
 Drew Remenda – TV colour analyst for the San Jose Sharks and radio show host
 Chico Resch – former National Hockey League goalie
 Kyle Riabko – actor and musician
 Erika Ritter – playwright and broadcaster
 Jessica Robinson – country music singer
 Jim Robson – broadcaster
 Roy Romanow – former Premier of Saskatchewan
 Martha Rommelaere (1922-2011) – All-American Girls Professional Baseball League player
 Terry Ruskowski – hockey player

S 
 William Sarjeant – geology professor and author
 Fred Sasakamoose - First Canadian Aboriginal National Hockey League Player
 Brayden Schenn – NHL hockey player with Philadelphia Flyers
 Luke Schenn – NHL hockey player with Arizona Coyotes
 Karl Schubach – vocalist of metalcore band Misery Signals
 Thomas Walter Scott – First Premier of Saskatchewan
 Jack Semple – blues guitarist
 Shiloh – singer
 Sandra Schmirler (1963-2000) – former curler 3 time Canadian champion, 3 time World Champion, 1998 Olympic Games Gold Medallist
 Tesher (full name Hitesh Sharma) – singer, rapper, songwriter, and producer best known for his 2021 single "Jalebi Baby" featuring Jason Derulo
 Mike Sillinger – NHL player
 Brian Skrudland – former NHL hockey forward, two-time Stanley Cup Champion
 Arthur Slade – Governor General's Award-winning author
 Doug Smail – former National Hockey League player
 Theresa Sokyrka – musician, artist
 Brent Sopel – NHL hockey player with Atlanta Thrashers
 Levi Steinhauer – CFL player
 John Stevenson – politician
 Charley Stis (1884-1979) – professional baseball player, manager and umpire
 Jarret Stoll – NHL hockey player with Los Angeles Kings
 Neil Stonechild – high-profile victim of a starlight tour
 Joey Stylez (Joseph Laplante) – hip hop artist
 Stephen Surjik – television and motion picture director whose credits include The Kids in the Hall and Wayne's World 2
 David Sutcliffe – actor
 Anne Szumigalski – poet
 loe spussy - actor

T
 Dione Taylor – jazz singer
 Ross Thatcher – former Premier Province of Saskatchewan (1964–1971)
 Max Thompson – Nordic combined skier
 Dave Tippett – former NHL player, NHL coach
 Gordon Tootoosis – First Nations actor
 Shannon Tweed – actor, wife of Gene Simmons of KISS

U
 Geoffrey Ursell – writer

V
 Guy Vanderhaeghe – author
 Sugith Varughese – writer, director and actor
 Darren Veitch – former NHL player
 Jon Vickers – opera singer
 Suzie Vinnick – folk/blues singer-songwriter and guitarist

W
 Brad Wall – Former Premier
 Colter Wall — country and folk musician
 Owen Walter – hockey player
 Cam Ward – NHL hockey goaltender, Carolina Hurricanes
 Mildred Warwick (1922-2006) – All-American Girls Professional Baseball League player
 George Weaver – politician and metallurgical engineer 
 Ed Whalen – host and commentator, Stampede Wrestling
 Elizabeth Wicken (1927-2011) – All-American Girls Professional Baseball League player
 Doug Wickenheiser (1961-1999) – NHL player
 Hayley Wickenheiser – hockey player and multiple Olympic medallist 
 Rick Wilson – hockey player
 W. Brett Wilson – Business man and former star on Dragon's Den
 Steven Woods – Quack.com co-founder, current Google Waterloo site director
 Henry Woolf – actor
 Janet Wright – actress and cast member of Corner Gas

Y
 Dylan Yeo – hockey player
 Steven Yeun – actor

See also
 List of people from Prince Albert, Saskatchewan
 List of people from Regina, Saskatchewan
 List of people from Saskatoon

References